Sergei Nolbandov (1895-1971) was a Russian-born screenwriter, film producer and director. Nolbandov was born in Moscow in 1895. He later moved to Britain where he worked in the British film industry. He died in Lewes, Sussex in 1971.Sergei Nolbandov produced 'Memory of the Camps', documenting the conditions Allied troops found when they liberated Nazi concentration camps.

Filmography
Director
 Ships with Wings (1941)
 Undercover (1943)

Producer
 The Bells (1931)
 Convoy (1940)
 Value for Money (1955)
 She Didn't Say No! (1958)

Production Supervisor
 German Concentration Camps Factual Survey (1945)  
Screenwriter
 The Amateur Gentleman (1936)
 Fire Over England (1937)
 There Ain't No Justice (1939)
 The Four Just Men (1939)
 Ships with Wings (1941)

References

External links

1895 births
1971 deaths
Russian film directors
Male screenwriters
Russian male writers
Russian film producers
Writers from Moscow
20th-century Russian screenwriters
20th-century Russian male writers
Emigrants from the Russian Empire to the United Kingdom